Serbinów is a village in Świętokrzyskie Voivodeship.

It may also refer to:
 Serbinów (Borough in Tarnobrzeg), a borough in Tarnobrzeg, Subcarpathian Voivodeship
 Serbinów (Borough in Mińsk Mazowiecki), a borough in Mińsk Mazowiecki, Masovian Voivodeship
 Serbinów (Nights and Days), the setting of the novel Nights and Days by Maria Dąbrowska